Wooden Arms is the third album by Patrick Watson, released April 28, 2009 on Secret City Records. The album's first single, "Tracy's Waters", was released on March 5 and the group performed a new song, "Beijing", on CBC Radio's Q radio show on April 6. "Fireweed" was also released as a single and a music video was filmed, which features both live action and animation.

The album was nominated for the 2009 Polaris Music Prize, an award that Watson won in 2007 with the sophomore release, Close to Paradise.

The song "Big Bird in a Small Cage" was chosen as the Starbucks iTunes Pick of the Week for August 25, 2009.

The song "Beijing" was inspired by the movie Being John Malkovich, and the idea of finding oneself in someone else's life in Beijing.

The song "Summer Sleeps" (an iTunes and Vinyl bonus track) was used in the TV Show "Continuum" Season 1, episode 9.

Personnel
Guest musicians on the album include Lhasa de Sela, Katie Moore and Jace Lasek.

Track listing

Charts and certifications

Certification

References

2009 albums
Patrick Watson (musician) albums